, also known as or A Series of Paintings of Ainu Chieftains or Portraits of Ezo Chieftains, is a series of twelve painted portraits, dating to 1790, of Ainu elders in the aftermath of the Menashi–Kunashir rebellion. They are by the Japanese artist and Matsumae Domain retainer Kakizaki Hakyō (1764–1826). Eleven of the twelve paintings survive, in the collection of the Musée des Beaux-Arts et d'Archéologie de Besançon. A number of preparatory drawings and copies are to be found in collections in Japan. The clothing worn and other accoutrements depicted help cast light on late eighteenth-century connections between the indigenous inhabitants of Ezochi, the Wajin, China, and Russia. The portrait of Ininkari from the series also represents the earliest known documentation of brown bears (Ursus arctos) with white pelage, the so-called "Ininkari bears" that are to be found on Kunashir (Kunashiri) and Iturup (Etorofu) in the disputed Southern Kurils.

Historical background

In 1604, the Tokugawa shogunate granted the Matsumae Domain exclusivity in trade with the people of Ezo. From the 1630s, these exchanges were managed through the so-called akinaiba chigyo sei [ja] trade-fief system, which saw Ezochi demarcated into a number of trading posts (known as akinaiba or basho), each assigned to a senior vassal of the Matsumae clan, with exclusive rights to trade with the local Ainu. Following Shakushain's revolt and during the eighteenth century, this was gradually replaced by the basho ukeoi sei [ja] or subcontracted trading post system, with Japanese merchants granted rights to manage local trade on behalf of the Matsumae clan vassals, in exchange for commission. The outcome was loss of economic independence, as the Ainu increasingly became in effect labourers in fisheries and other businesses operated by Wajin merchants.

In 1788, merchant  began commercial fishing operations in the Menashi-Kunashiri area, employing Ainu workers to catch salmon and trouth for use as fertilizer. Worked so hard that they had insufficient time to lay up food for the winter, food shortages combined with overbearing behaviour — including fishery supervisors making Ainu wives their mistresses — and suspicions of poisonings sparked the Menashi–Kunashir rebellion of May 1789. While local potentate Tsukinoe was away hunting sea otters on Uruppu, seventy-one Wajin were killed, twenty-two of them on Kunashiri, the rest in the Menashi area, all but one of them (a Matsumae Domain soldier) Hidaya employees. When news reached Matsumae at the beginning of June, daimyō  despatched 260 soldiers, who made their way east, recruiting local Ainu chieftains as they went. Arriving in the Nemuro area in July, over three hundred of those involved surrendered, and of the thirty-eight directly involved in the killings — including Tsukinoe's son Seppayabu — all but one (who had fled) were beheaded, their heads stored in salt. In the aftermath, Matsumae Michihiro commissioned the Ishūretsuzō  series of portraits of twelve elders who had helped suppress the revolt.

Ethnographic detail and otherness

As was common in contemporary Ainu genre painting, the Ainu elders are depicted with stereotyped physiognomic and bodily deviations that emphasize their alterity, in particular hairiness — beards, unbound hair, hairy hands, hairy legs, hairy feet, a synophrys — also large noses and ears, and "sinister" sanpaku eyes. Moreover, their robes are wrapped right over left — known as  — a manner historically regarded as barbaric in the Sinosphere.

Series

Versions, copies, and related documents
  — two sets of preparatory sketches on paper, comprising: (a) thirteen sheets, nine of which are understood to be in the hand of Kakizaki Hakyō (those above of Mautarake, Tsukinoe, Shonko, Ikotoi, Ininkari, Nochikusa, Poroya, Nishikomake, and Chikiriashikai), with two different versions of Ininkari and three different versions of Tsukinoe, but lacking portraits of Ikorikayani and Shimochi, and with that of Chousama understood not to be Kakizaki Hakyō; in Hakodate City Central Library and designated a Prefectural Tangible Cultural Property; (b) three sheets, featuring Chousama, an early draft of Ikotoi, and another early draft of Tsukinoe, in a private collection
  — the finished 1790 series, in the Musée des Beaux-Arts et d'Archéologie de Besançon, comprising (a) eleven lengths of silk each with a painted portrait (that of Ikorikayani is missing) in the hand of Kakizaki Hakyō, fifth son of the seventh daimyō of Matsumae Domain , and (b) twenty-one lines of prefatory text, over two lengths of silk, in the hand of Matsumae Hironaga, fifth son of sixth daimyō ; of uncertain provenance, but catalogued in 1933 and identified as being by the artist in 1984
  —  a lengthy historical appendix in ink on paper in two versions, referred to as the hiragana edition and the katakana edition, by Matsumae Hironaga and dated Kansei 2 (1790); the katakana edition is in the Northern Studies Collection, Hokkaido University Library
  — two lengths of silk, with portraits of Ikotoi and Shonko; of uncertain date, but understood to be in Kakizaki Hakyō's hand; handed down within the Matsumae clan and now in Hakodate City Central Library
  — ink on paper, a 1791 document sent by Sasaki Nagahide to Kakizaki Hakyō on the occasion of the Ishūretsuzō being offered up for inspection by Emperor Kōkaku; in Hakodate City Central Library<ref>{{cite web |url=http://archives.c.fun.ac.jp/fronts/detail/scrollframe/54dddb2d1a5572b7d00001b3 |script-title=ja:夷酋列像叡覧文書 |trans-title=Ishūretsuzō eiran monsho" |language=ja |publisher=Hakodate City Central Library |access-date=9 June 2022}}</ref>
  — a single volume paper copy of uncertain date of the katakana edition of Matsumae Hironaga's appendix; at the National Museum of Ethnology
  — two scrolls on paper totalling over sixteen metres and dating to 1798–1829, with copies of all twelve portraits and of the hiragana edition of Matsumae Hironaga's appendix, with the text in the hand of Matsudaira Sadanobu, third daimyō of Shirakawa Domain in southern Mutsu Province and rōjū at the time of the Kunashiri-Menashi Rebellion; his access to the originals may have been facilitated by the transfer of ninth daimyō Matsumae Akihiro to the nearby Yanagawa Domain from 1807 to 1821, in response to the arrival in the north of the Russians under Laxman and the British under Broughton; at the National Museum of Ethnology
  — portrait of Shimochi of 1802, colour on silk, by Kakizaki Hakyō; a different version from the portrait in the Ishūretsuzō series; private collection
  or Diary of the First Voyage to Ezo — illustrations, ink on paper, of 1850, by Matsuura Takeshirō (ICP); featuring the portraits of Nishikomake, Poroya, and Shimochi; Matsuura Takeshirō Memorial Museum
  — woodblock print edition containing a version of Shimochi, dating to 1859, by Matsuura Takeshirō
  — hanging scroll on silk of 1870, depicting Tsukinoe, by Kojima Sessō; private collection, deposited at 

Gallery

See also

 List of Cultural Properties of Japan - paintings (Hokkaidō)
 Orientalism (book) Shinra no Kiroku''

References

Ainu
History of Hokkaido
Japanese paintings
1790 paintings